Mallophora leschenaulti, known generally as the belzebul bee-eater or black bee killer, is a species of robber fly in the family Asilidae.

References

Asilidae
Articles created by Qbugbot
Insects described in 1838